The United Democratic Forces (FDU) is a political alliance in Benin led by Mathurin Nago.

History
In response to president Yayi Boni's potential constitution change to allow him to run for a third term, Nago left the Cowry Forces for an Emerging Benin. The FDU was established on 9 February 2015 as an alliance of the Union for Progress and Democracy, Impulse for a New Vision of the Republic, the Party for Progress and Democracy and the Party for Democracy and Solidarity, all of which had previously been part of the Cowry Forces for an Emerging Benin.

The alliance won four seats in the 2015 parliamentary elections.

References

Political party alliances in Benin
2015 establishments in Benin
Political parties established in 2015